This is a list of people bearing the surname Sonkar.

Indian politicians

Member of Parliament 

Bizay Sonkar Shastri, Former Member of Parliament and current BJP spokesperson
Neelam Sonkar, 16th Lok Sabha
Rajnath Sonkar Shastri, Member of Parliament, Loksabha (1980-1984)
Ram Raj Sonkar, known as Udit Raj, Member of Parliament in the Lok Sabha
Vinod Sonkar, Member of the Lok Sabha since 2014

Member of Legislative Assembly 

Anchal Sonkar, member of the 2013 Legislative Assembly of India
Banke Lal Sonkar, member of 13th Legislative Assembly
Bheem Prasad Sonkar, Member of Uttar Pradesh Legislative Assembly
Jagdish Sonkar, Member of Uttar Pradesh Legislative Assembly
Kailash Nath Sonkar, Member of Uttar Pradesh Legislative Assembly
Prakash Sonkar, Former Member of Madhya Pradesh Legislative Assembly
Rajesh Sonkar, Member of Madhya Pradesh Legislative Assembly
Ravi Kumar Sonkar, Member of Uttar Pradesh Legislative Assembly
Shriram Sonkar, member of 11th, 13th, and 17th Legislative Assembly
Vidyasagar Sonkar, Member of Uttar Pradesh Legislative Council
Deep Chandra Sonkar, Former Member of Shahganj Legislative Assembly
Saroj Sonkar, MLA, She won Balha Assembly Constituency by 89627 votes in 2019 Sub-election.

Entertainment 
Pinki Sonkar, featured in Smile Pinki (2008), a 39-minute documentary directed by Megan Mylan. The documentary won the 81st Academy Awards for Best Documentary.

Sports person 
Barkha Sonkar, International basketball player, member of India women's national basketball team and represented India in 2017 FIBA WOMEN'S ASIA CUP DIVISION B.

References 

Lists of people by surname
Surnames